Cuban may refer to:
 Something of, from, or related to Cuba, a country in the Caribbean
 Cubans, people from Cuba, or of Cuban descent
 Cuban exile, a person who left Cuba for political reasons, or a descendant thereof
 Cuban citizen, a person who is part of the Cuban population, see Demographics of Cuba
 Cuban Spanish, the dialect of Cuba
 Cuban Americans, citizens of the United States who are of Cuban descent
 Cuban cigar, often referred to as "Cubans"
 Cuban culture
 Cuban cuisine
 Cuban sandwich
 Cuban-eight, a type of aerobatic maneuver

People with the surname
 Brian Cuban (born 1961), American lawyer and activist
 Mark Cuban (born 1958), American entrepreneur

See also
 Cuban Missile Crisis
 List of Cubans
 
 Cuban Boys, a British music act
 Kuban (disambiguation)
 Cubane

Language and nationality disambiguation pages